Adenodaphne is a genus of shrubs and small trees endemic to New Caledonia belonging to the family Lauraceae. The genus is related to Litsea. They have 12 chromosomes.

Characteristics

The genus includes species of trees, and shrubs, with evergreen foliage and inconspicuous flowers. Adenodaphne are dioecious and have mostly smooth, glossy, lauroid type leaves. 
They are evergreen tree with some species growing to 25 m tall.

The inflorescences are consisting in pseudo-umbels (a flat-topped or rounded flower cluster) that are arranged in a raceme, sometimes condensed, or a short-shoot or rarely sessile. Each pseudo-umbel with an involucre of decussate form, crossed in the form of an X, usually persistent bracts.
Leaves glabrous or pubescent, domatia absent.

Inflorescences axillary or solitary pseudoumbelas along very short sharp branches, appearing racemose, covered before anthesis by an involucre of bracts decussate.

The flower is from  greenish, yellow to white.  Male and female flower on different plants. The pollination is done by bees and other insects. The flowers are irregular. The flowers are unisexual, male flowers with 5 to 20 fertile stamens. The female flower has a globose ovary and a floral tube. The flowers could be without petals to nine petals by species. The petals when present are equal or unequal, often caducous during anthesis. In the stamens, several inner ones with glands.

Filaments are usually longer than the anthers. Anthers have four locules. The pollen sacs are arranged mostly in two pairs above each other, all introrse. Lower pollen sacs are latrorse. The staminodes usually are absent. The tepals usually are deciduous. The pistillo or gynoecium well developed to absent. Fruits on a light or markedly thickened pedicel, supported by a shallow or deep dome, simple margin. The flower have a flat to deeply cup-shaped receptacle. The fruit is a drupe of variable shape and size.e The most striking are its fruits, The fruit is an ellipsoid to ovoid drupe or berry, and the seed is a single kernel. Plum-like to olive-like drupe settled on a discoid small dome. With shape rounded or ovoid, brown to black, rarely green, purple, reddish, orange to pale yellow. The fruits are a very important food source for birds and other wildlife. The seed dispersion is the result of scattering by columbiform birds mostly but also bats and endemics birds like kagu, parrots or rallidaes. Most seeds pass through the bird's digestive system intact. Seed dispersal via ingestion by vertebrate animals, mostly birds and mammals, is the dispersal mechanism for most tree species.

Species
Adenodaphne corifolia
Adenodaphne macrophylla
Adenodaphne spathulata
Adenodaphne triplinervia
Adenodaphne uniflora

References

Lauraceae
Endemic flora of New Caledonia
Dioecious plants
Lauraceae genera